André Hoekstra (born 5 April 1962 in Baarn) is a retired Dutch footballer who played as a midfielder. Hoekstra made his professional debut at Feyenoord Rotterdam and also played for RKC Waalwijk at club level. At international level, he was capped once for Netherlands in 1984, scoring a goal. After his career he became a manager and served as an assistant coach with RBC Roosendaal, ADO Den Haag, and Excelsior Rotterdam, also holding the position of head coach with ADO Den Haag between 1998 and 1999.

Career statistics
 First match: 6 April 1982: Feyenoord Rotterdam – Roda JC, 1–0

Honours
Feyenoord
 Eredivisie: 1983–84
 KNVB Cup: 1983–84

References

 Profile

1962 births
Living people
Dutch footballers
Dutch football managers
Feyenoord players
RKC Waalwijk players
Association football midfielders
Netherlands international footballers
Eredivisie players
ADO Den Haag managers
People from Baarn
Footballers from Utrecht (province)